Massakre is a Chilean thrash metal band, and a pioneer for the genre both in Chile and throughout Latin America.

The band started as a garage band from 1982 to 1984 and moved into thrash metal in 1985. They have released four studio albums, and various demos and compilations. They are also known for using corpse paint in a thrash metal band, later imitated by others.

History

Beginnings 

Yanko Tólic started his musical career forming a garage band in 1982 named Sepulcro. The band did not find much success and Tólic changed the name to Embrión. He also developed his skills by studying guitar playing, with the Chilean scene dominated by rock bands like Tumulto, Sol y Medianoche and Congreso. Influenced by acts like Celtic Frost, Slayer and Hellhammer, he changed his genre to thrash metal and established the band Massakre in 1985, by recruiting Andrés Cabrío Marchant from Necrosis. The band appeared in major events in Santiago and Valparaiso, where there was great support for this type of music, alongside groups like Pentagram, Belial, Tormentor and Vulcano.

Career 

After completing a successful festival tour, the band released some demo tapes that became popular, the first being Pissing into the Mass Grave in 1986, followed the same year by Altazor and Beyond the Psychotic Redemption in 1988. The latter contains the song "Morbid Death" that became a metal anthem for followers. But with success came controversy. A great point of opposition to the band was it using corpse paint which brought in charges of Satanic rituals and animal sacrifice and being possessed by evil spirits. The band tried to stop these rumours, but the accusations continued.

Massakre released its first studio album in 1989. Entitled Massacre, although being thrash metal, it contained symphonic touches, and a conceptual story that links all the songs. But it was with the release of the better-produced Psychotic Redemption in 2001. With the release of their third studio album Crematorium in 2005, the band incorporated speed metal influences. The band continued to release material and has witnessed a comeback with the band also appearing in metal festivals like The Metal Fest in 2012.

Members

Band members 
Yanko Tólic – vocals, rhythm guitar (1982–present)
Eduardo Vidal – bass guitar (1986–2003, 2005–present)
Gabriel Head – lead guitar (2004–present)
Héctor Melo – drums, percussion (2010–present)

Past members 
Andres Nacrur – drums (1985–1986, 1998)
Jose Miguel Nacrur – guitar (1985–1986)
Mauricio Yañez – drums (1985)
Alfredo Torres – guitar (1985)
Christian Miccolo – bass (1985)
Claudio Muñoz – drums (1986)
Marco Carreño –  drums (1987 to 1990)
Manuel Castro – keyboards (1989–1990)
Alain Saintard – vocals (1990)
Patricio Albornoz – drums (1999)

Discography

Demos 
 Pissing into the Mass Grave (1986)
 Altazor (1986)
 Beyond the Psychotic Redemption (1988)

 Albums 
 Massacre (1989)
 Psychotic Redemption (2001)
 Crematorium (2005)

 EPs 
 In Aeternum (2011)

 Compilations 
 Back from the Mass Grave (2006)
 Pissing into the Mass Grave + Fantasmas (2007)

 Singles 
 Mortuary (2011)

 Not officially released 
 Demo I (1986)
 Demo II'' (1986)

References

External links 
Enciclopedia del Rock Chileno: Massakre

Chilean thrash metal musical groups
Chilean death metal musical groups
Chilean heavy metal musical groups